Skomrak is a village in Lyngdal municipality in Agder county, Norway. The village of Svenevik lies about  straight west across the fjord.

The Skomrak area is divided into three parts called Skomrak Indre (in the north), Skomrak (in the central part), and Skomrak Ytre (in the south). Prior to the merger in 1964, the border between Lyngdal municipality and Austad municipality ran right between Skomrak and Skomrak Ytre.

Most of the residents live in Skomrak Ytre where there is  a large residential development.

References

Villages in Agder
Lyngdal
North Sea